The Port Management Association of Eastern and Southern Africa (PMAESA) is a non-profit, inter-governmental organization made up of Port Operators, Government Line Ministries, Logistics and Maritime Service Providers and other port and shipping stakeholders from the Eastern, Western and Southern African and Indian Ocean regions.

History
PMAESA was first established as the Port Management Association of Eastern Africa, in Mombasa, Kenya, in April 1973, under the auspices of the United Nations Economic Commission for Africa (UNECA), following a recommendation made at a meeting of the African Ministers in charge of transport, held in Tunisia in February 1971.

Objectives
PMAESA's primary objective is to strengthen relations among member ports with a view to promoting regional cooperation and subsequently regional integration. The Association offers an appropriate framework for the exchange of information and ideas among members and to create an enabling environment whereby members can interface with one another in the port, transport and trade arenas.

PMAESA also works towards improving conditions of operation and management of ports in its region of coverage with a view to enhancing their productivity.

PMAESA seeks to maintain relations with other port authorities or associations, regional and international organizations and governments of the region to hold discussions on matters of common interest

Membership
The members of the group are thus organized:
 Eastern Coastal members: Eritrea, Djibouti, Kenya, Sudan, and Tanzania.
 Southern Coastal members: Angola, Mozambique, Namibia, and South Africa.
 Landlocked members with lake ports: Burundi, Rwanda, Zambia and Zimbabwe,
 Indian Ocean islands: Madagascar, Mauritius, Réunion (an overseas department of France), Seychelles and Zanzibar.

Reporting membership consists of the port authorities of the member countries and ports; please see :Category:Port authorities for relevant articles.

Secretariat
The PMAESA Secretariat, based in Mombasa, Kenya was established to coordinate the activities of the Association.

Activities
Maritime safety and protection of the marine environment, transit transport, port operations issues such as port statistics, the public sector-private sector partnership, communication, the cruise industry and regional cooperation are PMAESA's main areas of activity.

See also
 Indian Ocean
 Mozambique Channel
 Piracy in Somalia
 Red Sea

References

External links
 Port Management Association of Eastern and Southern Africa official site
 The Standard, "How ports in Africa plan to tackle waste management" 5 February 2009

Port authorities
International organizations based in Africa
Transport in Africa
Maritime organizations
Ports and harbours of the Indian Ocean
Ports and harbours in Africa
Mozambique Channel
Red Sea
Lake Kivu
Lake Tanganyika
Mombasa